Banco is a 1972 autobiography by Henri Charrière, it is a sequel to his previous novel Papillon. It documents Charrière's life in Venezuela, where he arrived after his escape from the penal colony on Devil's Island.

Synopsis
Continuing on from Papillon, Banco relates Henri's life in Venezuela attempting to raise funds to seek revenge for his false imprisonment and to see his father. After many failed enterprises, including diamond mining, a bank robbery and a jewellery heist, he found success in Venezuela running various restaurants. The book provides more detail about the crime he was falsely accused and convicted of committing in France, his arrest, trial and views on French justice. Towards the end of the book, he returns to France as a free man.

Adaptations
 Papillon (2017), film directed by Michael Noer, based on novels Papillon and Banco

External links
 

1972 French novels
French autobiographical novels
Novels set in Venezuela